Rhaebus (from the Greek:  curved) is a genus of metallic bean weevils in the subfamily Bruchinae, and the only member of the tribe Rhaebini. It is restricted to the Palearctic region.

Appearance 
Rhaebus beetles are small, measuring between 3-5 millimetres in length, and are metallic in colour, which is rare in members if the Bruchinae subfamily. Their bodies are elongated in shape, and the antennae vary.

Diet and life cycle 
Rhaebus beetles feed exclusively on plants of the genus Nitraria, where their young also develop.

Taxonomic history 
The genus was first described in 1824 by Gotthelf Fischer von Waldheim in his book Entomographie de la Russie. He described it with only one species, Rh. gebleri, making the genus monotypic.

Species creation & synonymy 

 1845: Rhaebus fischeri mentioned by Jean T. Lacordaire, not described.
 1845: Rhaebus mannerheimi named and described by Victor Motschulsky.
 1866: Rhaebus sagroides named and described by Simon Martinovitch Solsky.
 1867: Rhaebus beckeri named and described by Christian W. L. E. Suffrain. The original description (in German) is available from Wikimedia Commons.
 1869: Rh. beckeri and Rh. sagroides synonymized with Rh. mannerheimi by Victor Motchulsky.
 1879: Rhaebus solskyi proposed by Ernst Gustav Kraatz.
 1939: Rhaebus komarovi named and described by Fyodor Lukyanovich.
 1973: Rhaebus lukjanovitschi named and described by Margarita Ervandovna Ter-Minassian.
 2000: Rhaebus amnoni named and described by Igor Lopatin and Vladimir Chikatunov, after Dr. Amnon Freidberg.
 2022: Rh. amnoni, Rh. komarovi, and Rh. mannerheimi synonymized with Rh. gebleri by Andrei Legalov.

Species 
Since a taxonomic review in August 2022, Rhaebus has three species:

 Rhaebus gebleri Fischer von Waldheim, 1824 (=Rh. mannerheimi, Rh. amnoni, Rh. komarovi) -  Found in Turkey, Israel, Southern Russia, Kazakhstan, Mongolia, Inner Mongolia (China), and Kyrgyzstan.
 Rhaebus lukjanovitschi Ter-Minassian, 1973  - Found in Mongolia and Inner Mongolia (China)
 Rhaebus solskyi Kraatz, 1879 - Found in Kazakhstan, Southern Russia, Mongolia, and China.

References 

Bruchinae
Chrysomelidae genera
Taxa named by Gotthelf Fischer von Waldheim